Deer Squad is a Chinese computer-animated children's television series produced by iQIYI in Beijing. The show started out as a series of shorts on China Central Television. The first episode of the full series premiered on iQIYI's video platform on July 15, 2020. The series is about four deer characters (Kai, Lola, Rammy, and Bobbi). The show made its premiere in the US on January 25, 2021.

The show was first announced under the title Deer Run. Nickelodeon has overseas broadcasting rights to the show. The second season was released on January 14, 2022. 

On September 20, 2022, iQIYI has announced that a third season will be released on the second quarter of 2023.

According to Xiaoxuan Yang, vice president of iQIYI, Deer Squad ranked in the top five children's shows launched on the iQIYI service in 2020.

Premise
Kai, Lola, Rammy, and Bobbi are anthropomorphic four deer friends who reside in a boat-shaped home in the forest. The forest where their home is also has a park where people from a nearby city hang out. Whenever there is trouble in the forest or city, the deer friends, when within proximity of each other, can go into superhero mode, and use their powers to save the day.

Characters

Deer Squad members
 Kai (voiced by Brody Allen in English) is the yellow deer who is the leader of the Deer Squad and the group's tech wizard. He has water powers and a hovercraft.
 Lola (voiced by Juliet Rusche in English) is the pink deer who can grow plants on anything, and a car that can fly.
 Rammy (voiced by Holden Thomas in English) is the big red deer who has heat powers and a race car that is able to convert into a robotic horse which is able to leap high.
 Bobbi (voiced by Connor Elias Andrade in English) is the small green deer who has earth powers. He also has the ability to understand babbling animals and likes making desserts.
 Jade (voiced by Azury-Hardy Jones in English) is the blue deer who was first introduced in season 2 as the newest member of the team. She has crystal powers and a drill cart with a crystal driller and three boosters. She is also a crystal expert and knows all about gemstones.
 Wufu is a purple and yellow butterfly who is Jade's companion, and was also introduced in season 2. He doesn't talk but can whisper to Jade's ear so she can understand what he is saying.

Recurring
 Sir Steel (voiced by Doug Erholtz in English) is a conceited wealthy entrepreneur who comes up with various plans either for profit or to simply provide himself with convenience even if it means causing problems in the city or wilderness which he does not seem to mind or realize. Though not entirely bald (he has a small hook of hair at the very top), Sir Steel wears a wig which is seen coming off sometimes. He is also the main antagonist of the series.
 Professor Scratch (voiced by Julie Maddalena Kliewer in English) is Sir Steel's personal scientist.
 Muffin is Sir Steel's pet poodle. Sir Steel is quite protective of her.
 Ian (voiced by Mr. Lawrence in English) is a white duck who is a friend of the Deer Squad. He likes keeping the park in order, and would sometimes dispatch the Deer Squad with his tuba when he notices trouble. He also has ducklings to care for.
 Tina (voiced by Samantha Hahn in English) is a green turtle who is also a friend of the Deer Squad. She has three children.
 Fifi and Sasha (both voiced by Andie Mechanic in English) are two swans.
 Ricardo (voiced by Jaiden Cannatelli in English) is a helium-voiced squirrel who likes to play pranks. He has an affinity for his tail which he named Ramona.
 Catherine (voiced by Gabby Clarke in English) is a young and heartfelt-looking female crocodile who resides in a place called The Sewer.

Episodes

Season 1 (2021)

Season 2 (2022)

References

External links
Official website
 

2020 Chinese television series debuts
2020s children's television series
2020 animated television series debuts
2020s preschool education television series
2020 web series debuts
Computer-animated television series
Chinese children's animated action television series
Chinese children's animated adventure television series
Chinese children's animated science fiction television series
Animated preschool education television series
English-language television shows
Chinese-language television shows
Nick Jr. original programming
Treehouse TV original programming
IQIYI original programming
Television series about deer and moose
Animated television series about children
Talking animals in fiction
Fictional quartets
Television shows set in Shanghai
Forests in fiction
Television series impacted by the COVID-19 pandemic